Harora  was one of the 425 constituencies of the Uttar Pradesh Legislative Assembly, India. It was a part of the Saharanpur district and one of the assembly constituencies in the Saharanpur (Lok Sabha constituency). Harora Assembly constituency came into existence in 1957 and ceased to exist in 2008 as a result of "Delimitation of Parliamentary and Assembly Constituencies Order, 2008".

Members of the Legislative Assembly

See also 

 Harora Aht.
 Harora Must.
 Government of Uttar Pradesh
 List of Vidhan Sabha constituencies of Uttar Pradesh
 Uttar Pradesh
 Uttar Pradesh Legislative Assembly

References 

Politics of Saharanpur district
Former assembly constituencies of Uttar Pradesh